Isabelle von Bueltzingsloewen (born 1964) is a French historian. She specializes in the history of public health and medical treatment. She is a professor of contemporary history at the Lumière University Lyon 2. She is a member of the Bültzingslöwen family, a Thuringian noble family.

References 

Living people
1964 births
French women historians
French medical historians
Academic staff of the University of Lyon
20th-century French historians
20th-century French women writers
21st-century French historians
21st-century French women writers
German untitled nobility
Von Bültzingslöwen family